Victor Akolade Olowu (born October 8, 1992) is a Nigerian on-air personality and media entrepreneur, popularly known as Kolade, Mr Dominate or  Kolade Dominate.

Early life
He was born on October 8, 1992 in Ijebu, Ogun State, Nigeria. He went to school in Mayflower school Ikenne for his secondary education, and went further to study presentation in Federal Radio Corporation of Nigeria. He also has a digital multimedia technology degree from highland College of technology and a degree in mass communication from the Institut Superieur De Communication Et De Gestion and the Université Protestante de l'Afrique de l'Ouest in Porto Novo, Benin.

Career
After attending the Federal Radio Corporation of Nigeria training school now the Broadcasting Academy of Nigeria to study presentation, he decided to concentrate on his broadcasting career with the help of Dj ShyShy Shyllon, Dj Boombastic to name a few who helped him sharpen his skills. He kicked off his broadcasting career in 2013 at Star FM, Lagos as a host of the radio drive time show where he served for about two years before he began to host other radio shows.

After handling the radio programs for two years, he inked a deal with Starlite online radio where he handled programming and productions for 6 months. Moved from there to Nigeria's first private radio station Raypower fm. After a short stint with the Lagos branch, He moved to Ray power 95.1 FM Ibadan in January 2015. At his stay, he was the head of production and programs, where he anchored the ‘’ultimate Morning show, Raypower lounge, Soul serenade the drive time show ‘’Power Play’’ every week day, the Saturday evening groove and the Sunday afternoon special.

He resigned on the 30th of November 2018 and left for splash 105.5fm Ibadan, where he hosted programs such as the Smooth Home Drive on weekdays, Men United and Juicy Friday Night, Morning Splash Xtra, and his brainchild program The Splash Music Box that still airs on Saturday on the station amongst others. He resigned on Christmas Day in December 2020 and left for Inspiration 92.3 FM Lagos, where he currently handles the breakfast jam from 6am to 10:30am amongst other radio programs.

In 2018, Kolade established a fast rising Talent Promotion, PR and Management outfit ‘’10O8World’’, which presently houses Dotman,Sean Tizzle and some other acts who are still under grooming.10O8 World remains one of Nigeria's fast rising management outfit, the firm over the years has plugged, distributed and promoted a wide range of afrobeats artists and their songs such as Akube, My Woman, Feelings and Enugbe by Dotman, Economy by 9ice, Totori by ID Cabasa ft Wizkid, Olamide, Nobody Fine Pass You by T Classic, Cunny Cunny By BBNaija star Debie Rise, Tanasha Donna (Kenya), Informate and See Mary see Jesus by DJ KAYWISE to name a few with the level of connections and media relations they possess across the country and beyond.Kolade has had sit down conversations with Major entertainment stakeholders and players Dbanj, Chike, Terry Apala, 2baba, Joeboy, DJ Neptune, DJ Jimmy Jatt, Banky W, DJ Kaywise, Teni, 9ice, ID Cabasa, Mayorkun, Oxlade, Tems, Dremo, Jaywon, Olamide, Bad Boy Timz, Omah Lay, Tems, Vector, Cute Abiola, to name a few.

Awards
Kolade has been recognized as one of the most influential media personality in the southern region of Nigeria. He has been nominated and recognized by several awards organizing body and has won quite a number of awards and recognition. In 2017, he was awarded the on air personality of the year at the MAYA awards. He was also awarded the same award category in the Cool Wealth Awards in 2018, Ice Gate Awards in 2018 & Jkrue All Youths awards in 2019. In July 2018, he was awarded as one of the most influential media personnels in the south west of Nigeria also enlisted among radiocast.ng's most influential OAPs across the country in 2020.

References

Living people
1992 births
Mayflower School alumni
Talent managers
Nigerian journalists
Nigerian musicians
Nigerian music industry executives